also known as Oniniwa Sagetsusai was a Japanese samurai of the Sengoku period who served Date clan. He was deeply trusted by Date Terumune and Date Masamune.

Yoshinao at the age of 73, bravely fought to let Masamune go during the Battle of Hitotoribashi, His army killed many of Iwaki clan's men but finally was killed by Iwaki Tsunetaka's general Kubota Jūrō. Thanks to Yoshinao, Masamune was able to escape to Motomiya castle. His son, Oniniwa Tsunamoto, and his daughter, Katakura Kita, also worked for Date clan and won Masamune's great trust.

In fiction
In NHK's 1987 Taiga drama Dokuganryū Masamune, Yoshinao was played by Chosuke Ikariya.

References

Samurai
1513 births
1586 deaths
Date clan
Japanese warriors killed in battle
People from Fukushima Prefecture